"Here for a Good Time" is a song co-written and recorded by American country music singer George Strait.  It was released in June 2011 as the 92nd single of his career, and the first single and title track from the album  of the same name.  He and his son, Bubba, co-wrote it with Dean Dillon, who has also co-written several of Strait's other hits.

Live
George uses this as the lead song for the Here for a Good Time tour.

Critical reception
Billy Dukes of Taste of Country rated the song four stars out of five, saying that its "uptempo shuffle fits right in with what Strait has done musically over the last five years."

Chart performance
"Here for a Good Time" debuted at number 29 on the Hot Country Songs charts, making the second-highest debut of his career. It became Strait's 84th Top 10 single on the country chart in September 2011. It peaked at number 2 for the chart week of October 29, behind Blake Shelton's "God Gave Me You."

Year-end charts

Certifications

References

2011 singles
2011 songs
George Strait songs
Songs written by George Strait
Songs written by Dean Dillon
Song recordings produced by Tony Brown (record producer)
MCA Nashville Records singles